The  is a  railway line in Kanagawa Prefecture, Japan, operated by the private railway operator Keikyu. It connects Keikyu Kawasaki Station and Kojimashinden Station, both located in Kawasaki-ku, Kawasaki.

Service patterns
Keikyu Daishi Line services are operated only by four-car electric multiple unit (EMU) trains, stopping at all stations between Keikyu Kawasaki and Kojimashinden. During the weekday off-peak, trains run at 10-minute intervals, increased to 5-minute intervals during the morning and evening peaks.

Stations
All stations are located in Kawasaki-ku, Kawasaki.

Rolling stock
Services on the line are operated using four-car Keikyu 1500 series EMUs, but are occasionally operated by other types, including four-car Keikyu 600 series, or Keikyu N1000 series EMUs.

History

The company was renamed  on 25 April 1899. The line was double-tracked over its entire length from 29 November the same year, and extended from Rokugōbashi Station to the present-day Keikyu Kawasaki Station on 1 September 1902.

The line was extended to Sakuramoto in 1945, and the overhead line voltage was raised from the original 600 V DC to 1,500 V DC on 16 March 1951 except for the Shiohama to Sakuramoto section, which was transferred to the Kawasaki Streetcar Co. and operated as a tramway.

Originally, the line was built to transport the visitors of Kawasaki Daishi buddhist temple. But later, factory workers increased, as the east side of the temple became an industrial zone.

See also
 List of railway lines in Japan

References

External links

 Keikyu route information 

 
Daishi Line
Railway lines in Kanagawa Prefecture
Transport in Kawasaki, Kanagawa
Standard gauge railways in Japan
Railway lines opened in 1899
1899 establishments in Japan